Commerce Independent School District is a public school district based in Commerce, Texas (USA).

In addition to Commerce, the district also serves the town of Neylandville. Although located mostly in Hunt County, the district extends into a very small portion of Delta County.

In 2009, the school district was rated "academically acceptable" by the Texas Education Agency.

Schools
Commerce High School (Grades 9-12)
Commerce Middle School (Grades 6–8)
Albert C. Williams Elementary School (Grades 3–5)
Commerce Elementary School (Grades PK-2)

Principals
CHS- Steve Drummond 
CMS- Tina Bronson 
ACW- Deanna Hays
CES- Diane Stegall

References

Further reading

External links

Commerce ISD

School districts in Hunt County, Texas
School districts in Delta County, Texas